At Your Service is the debut live album by English-American hard rock supergroup Sammy Hagar and the Circle, released on May 19, 2015. It includes music originally recorded by Montrose, Van Halen, Sammy Hagar and The Waboritas, and Led Zeppelin.

A live DVD of this album was released in December 2015. It includes all tracks except for the solos.

Track listing

Personnel
Sammy Hagar and the Circle

Michael Anthony – bass guitar, backing vocals
Jason Bonham – drums
Sammy Hagar – lead vocals, guitar
Vic Johnson – guitar, backing vocals

Production

Paul Binder – production manager
Stephen "Three" Edgerly – drum tech
Jim "Rosie" Greenawalt – lighting designer
Jim Jorgensen – monitor engineer
Kenny "Flounder" Mason – lighting crew chief
Gary Notley – production assistant

Charts

References

2015 live albums
The Circle (band) live albums
2015 debut albums
Live video albums
The Circle (band) video albums
2015 video albums